is a Japanese curler from Sapporo.

Career
She made her World Championship debut at the 2003 Winnipeg World Championships playing lead for Shinobu Aota's team from Japan. She would return to the world championships in 2004 with the same team.

Her next World Championships came in 2008, where the Japanese women (along with Team China) became the first team from the Pacific region to qualify for the Playoffs at the World Championships. Ishizaki and her team, skipped by Moe Meguro, defeated Team Switzerland in the 3 vs. 4 Playoff match. In the Semifinal, they nearly defeated Team Canada and went to the Bronze Medal match to face a rematch against Team Switzerland. They would lose this match 9 - 7, which would become the second-best performance by a Pacific region team at the Curling World Championships.

Kotomi Ishizaki played Lead position for Team Japan at the 2010 Winter Olympics. and at the 2010 Ford World Women's Curling Championship.

Ishizaki was chosen as an alternate member for Team Japan at the 2022 Winter Olympics, in which they won first-ever silver medals. Ishizaki became the oldest Japanese athlete to win a medal at the Winter Olympics at age 43 years and 1 month, surpassing Noriaki Kasai, who won 2 medals at the 2014 Winter Olympics at age 41 years and 8 months.

Teammates 
2022 Beijing Olympic Games

Satsuki Fujisawa, Skip

Chinami Yoshida Third

Yumi Suzuki Second

Yurika Yoshida Lead

2010 Vancouver Olympic Games

Moe Meguro, Skip

Anna Ohmiya, Third

Mari Motohashi, Second

Mayo Yamaura, Alternate

2002 Salt Lake City Olympic Games

Akiko Katoh, Skip

Yumie Hayashi, Third

Ayumi Onodera, Second

Mika Konaka, Lead

References

External links
 

1979 births
Living people
Japanese female curlers
Olympic curlers of Japan
Curlers at the 2002 Winter Olympics
Curlers at the 2010 Winter Olympics
Curlers at the 2022 Winter Olympics
Asian Games medalists in curling
Curlers at the 2003 Asian Winter Games
Medalists at the 2003 Asian Winter Games
Asian Games gold medalists for Japan
Pacific-Asian curling champions
Olympic silver medalists for Japan
Olympic medalists in curling
Medalists at the 2022 Winter Olympics
Pan Continental curling champions
People from Asahikawa
Sportspeople from Sapporo
20th-century Japanese women
21st-century Japanese women